An Accredited Social Health Activist (ASHA) is a community health worker employed by the Ministry of Health and Family Welfare (MoHFW) as a part of India's National Rural Health Mission (NRHM). The mission began in 2005; full implementation was targeted for 2012. The idea behind the Accredited Social Health Activist (ASHA) was to connect marginalized communities to the health care system. The target was to have an "ASHA in every village" in India. In July 2013, the number of ASHAs was reported to be 870,089. In 2018, this number became 939,978. The ideal number of ASHAs envisaged was 1,022,265.

Roles and responsibilities

ASHAs are women trained to act as health educators and health promoters in their communities. The Indian MoHFW describes them as:...health activist(s) in the community who create awareness on health and its social determinants and mobilize the community towards local health planning and increased utilization and accountability of the existing health services.

Their tasks include:
 Motivating women to give birth in hospitals,
 Bringing children to immunization clinics,
 Encouraging family planning (e.g., surgical sterilization),
 Treating basic illness and injury with first aid,
 Keeping demographic records, and
 Improving village sanitation.
ASHAs also serve as a key communication mechanism between the healthcare system and rural populations.

An ASHA acts as a depot holder for essential provisions being made available to all habitations like:
 Oral Rehydration Salts (ORS) Therapy,
 Iron Folic Acid (IFA) Tablets,
 Chloroquine,
 Disposable Delivery Kits (DDK),
 Oral Pills &
 Condoms.

Their responsibilities can be classified into:

 Counseling:

 * Breast Feeding
 * Skilled birth attendance
 * Prevention of diseases

 Community sensitization:

 * Health
 * Nutrition
 * Related government programs

 Provision of drugs:

 * Malaria
 * Tuberculosis
 * Diarrhoea

 Escort:

 * Ante- and Post-natal care
 * Institutional delivery
 * Immunization
 * Diabetes test
 * Family planning

 Diagnosis

 * Malaria
 * Pregnancy

 Survey of health and related events

 Others

 * Community mobilization
 * Health planning
 * Participation in community health and allied activities

Selection

 ASHAs must primarily be female residents of the village that they have been selected to serve, who are likely to remain in that village for the foreseeable future.
 Married, widowed or divorced women are preferred over women who are yet to marry, since Indian cultural norms dictate that, upon marriage, a woman leaves her home and/ or village and migrates to that of her husband.
 ASHAs must have qualified up to the tenth grade; if there is no suitable literate candidate, this criterion may be relaxed.
 They must preferably be between the ages of 25 and 45.
 They are selected by and accountable to the gram panchayat (local government).

Remuneration
Although ASHAs are considered volunteers, they receive outcome-based remuneration and financial compensation for training days. For example, if an ASHA facilitates an institutional delivery she receives  and the mother receives . ASHAs are expected to attend a Wednesday meeting at the local primary health centre (PHC); beyond this requirement, the time ASHAs spend on their CHW tasks is relatively flexible.

An ASHA's monthly salary has two components:
 A fixed component of Rs. 4,000/- (USD 53/- approximately), and
 Incentives that vary from Rs. 5,000/- (USD 67/- approximately) to Rs. 8,000/- (USD 107 approximately), including a "COVID Bonus".

The average monthly salary comes to around Rs. 10,000/- (USD 133/- approximately).

Monitoring and Evaluation under National Rural Health Mission
A baseline survey was taken at the district level, for fixing decentralized monitoring goals and indicators. Community monitoring is at the village level. The Planning Commission is the ultimate agency for monitoring outcomes. External evaluation is taken up at regular intervals.

See also
Auxiliary Nurse Midwife (ANM)
Vikas yojna
Jawaharlal Nehru National Urban Renewal Mission
Mahatma Gandhi National Rural Employment Guarantee Act

References

Rural development in India
Health programmes in India